Belgium have appeared in the finals tournament of the FIFA World Cup on 14 occasions, the first being at the first FIFA World Cup in 1930 where they finished in 11th place and played the first ever World Cup match against the United States. The inaugural FIFA World Cup final was officiated by Belgian referee John Langenus.

Traditionally, Belgium's greatest rival is the Netherlands. The two countries have met each other twice in the history of the FIFA World Cup, with one win for Belgium (USA 1994) and one draw (France 1998). The team that has played the most against Belgium in the finals is the continuum USSR-Russia: five times, with three victories for Belgium and two for the Soviet Union.

Belgium's best finish in the World Cup is third, at the Russia 2018 tournament. Belgium previously finished fourth in the Mexico 1986 competition.

FIFA World Cup record
Belgian's first five appearances at the FIFA World Cup between 1930 and 1970 were not successful, as they failed to advance beyond the first round. After two scoreless defeats at the inaugural World Cup in 1930, Belgium scored their first two World Cup goals in 1934 against Germany, by virtue of Bernard Voorhoof. However, both in 1934 and 1938 the Red Devils went out with a single loss. In 1954 they held England to a draw (4–4) and in 1970 they achieved their first World Cup win, against El Salvador (3–0).

Belgium reached six successive World Cups from 1982 through 2002 by playing qualification rounds, a record bettered only by Spain whose 2018 World Cup is their ninth consecutive qualification (a streak going back to 1986). Every other nation with an equal or longer string of appearances has had the streak "interrupted" by automatic qualification as the host or the defending champion (the 2006 tournament was the first for which the defending champion does not automatically qualify). On top of that, in that era the Belgian team reached the second phase five out of six times.

Their fourth-place finish in the 1986 was their best placement in their World Cup history, until 2018 when they finished third after beating England (2-0) in Saint Petersburg.

1930 FIFA World Cup

1934 FIFA World Cup
The group stage used in the first World Cup was discarded in favour of a straight knockout tournament.

1938 FIFA World Cup

1954 FIFA World Cup
According to journalist Henry Guldemont, some of his Swiss colleagues regarded the 1954 Belgian team as "favourites for the world title" after a promising 4–4 opener against England. However, in the second and last group match against Italy, Belgium was defeated 1–4 and was unable to proceed to the finals.

1970 FIFA World Cup

1982 FIFA World Cup
In the first game of the 1982 FIFA World Cup, held at Camp Nou, Belgium celebrated one of their most famous victories: a 0–1 win over defending champions Argentina with a goal by Erwin Vandenbergh. After pushing through to the second group stage of that tournament, Belgium was stunned by a Polish hat-trick from Zbigniew Boniek. The decisive match against the Soviet Union ended in a 0–1 loss.

Group 3

Group A

1986 FIFA World Cup
Four years later they achieved their best World Cup run to that point when they placed fourth at Mexico 1986. Picked up as the best third-placed team, in the knockout phase Belgium surprisingly won against favourites Soviet Union after extra time (3–4). Different from the previous World Cup, the Red Devils were able to surmount an opponents' hat-trick (this time from Igor Belanov), something that only Brazil and Austria achieved as well in World Cup history (respectively in 1938 and 1954). Belgium also beat Spain on penalties after a 1–1 draw, but they conceded a 2–0 loss against eventual champions Argentina in the semifinal - both goals scored by football icon Diego Maradona. In the third-place match Belgium lost to France (4–2) after extra time. Captain and midfielder Jan Ceulemans and goalkeeper Jean-Marie Pfaff were the first Belgian players to be selected in the All-Star Team of a World Cup. Enzo Scifo was elected as best young player of the tournament.

1990 FIFA World Cup
In the 1990 FIFA World Cup, Belgium survived the group phase by wins against South Korea and Uruguay (2–0 and 3–1). In the second round they did well against England, dominating the match by periods and with Enzo Scifo even hitting the woodwork twice. With a persisting 0–0 penalties seemed unavoidable, but eventually they lost in the last minute of extra time after a "nearly blind" volley by David Platt. Scifo was elected as second best player of the 1990 World Cup after Lothar Matthäus.

1994 FIFA World Cup
In the 1994 FIFA World Cup two 1–0 wins in round 1 against Morocco and the Netherlands were remarkably not enough to finish second, but Belgium advanced as they were among the best four third-placed teams. In the second round they lost to title defenders Germany (3–2). During this last game, the Belgians were frustrated that Swiss referee Kurt Röthlisberger had not awarded them a penalty kick when German defender Thomas Helmer brought down their striker Josip Weber in the penalty area with a bump from behind. After the match, Röthlisberger was sent home. Michel Preud'homme was elected as best goalkeeper of the tournament.

1998 FIFA World Cup
In 1998 Belgium was one of only three teams, along with hosts and eventual world champions France and Italy, not to lose a single game. Three draws in the first round – against Netherlands, Mexico and South Korea – proved not enough to reach the knockout stage. In 1998 Enzo Scifo and Franky Van der Elst appeared in their fourth World Cups, setting a Belgian record.

2002 FIFA World Cup
With two ties, the 2002 FIFA World Cup did not start well for Belgium, but the team improved during the tournament. Captain Marc Wilmots was notable for scoring in every match of the first round. Belgium won the decisive group match against Russia with 3–2 and in the second round they had to play against eventual champions Brazil. In this 1/8th final, referee Peter Prendergast disallowed a headed goal by Wilmots that would have given Belgium a 0–1 lead, after a "phantom foul" on Roque Júnior. Eventually Brazil won 2–0, but Brazilian coach Luiz Felipe Scolari admitted after this match that Belgium was a tough edge and after the tournament he declared that the match against the Red Devils had been the hardest for Brazil to win. With the World Cup final still to go, the team did win the tournament's fair-play award. Marc Wilmots equalled the record of Enzo Scifo and Franky Van der Elst by appearing in 4 World Cup squads, although he did not play in his first World Cup in 1990. Wilmots also scored his 5th World Cup goal against Russia, which made him Belgium's top scorer in World Cup Finals matches until the 2018 world cup when Romelu Lukaku also scored his 5th World Cup goal.

2014 FIFA World Cup
In 2014, Belgium started as group favourites and beat all group opponents with the smallest margin. Thereafter, they played a round of 16 match against the United States in which American goalkeeper Tim Howard made 15 saves, crowning himself man of the match. The Red Devils needed the extra time to proceed to the next stage (2–1), where they faced Argentina. In a balanced quarter-final against the Albiceleste, the World Cup ended for Belgium as they failed to equalize after Gonzalo Higuaín's early goal.

2018 FIFA World Cup

2022 FIFA World Cup

Overview

Tournaments
 Champions   Runners-up   Third place   Fourth place

Matches

Record players

Goalscorers

Awards

Team

FIFA Fair Play Trophy 2002

Individual

Golden Glove 1986: Jean-Marie Pfaff
Golden Glove 1994: Michel Preud'homme
Golden Glove 2018: Thibaut Courtois
Best Young Player Award 1986: Enzo Scifo
Silver Ball 2018: Eden Hazard

See also
 Belgium national football team records
 Belgium at the UEFA European Championship

Footnotes

References

Bibliography

External links
Belgium at FIFA
World Cup Finals Statistics

 
Countries at the FIFA World Cup
World Cup